Cara Elizabeth DeLizia (born April 10, 1984) is a former American actress. She is best known for her role as Fiona "Fi" Phillips in the Disney Channel Original Series So Weird. She is the younger sister of Melissa DeLizia, and the youngest daughter of James DeLizia and Sherry DeLizia.

Career

Early career
DeLizia got her start in acting at the age of five doing theater productions. She was later discovered and starred regularly in the WB's Nick Freno: Licensed Teacher. Later she had guest spots on Mad About You, 7th Heaven, The West Wing (in "The Stackhouse Filibuster"), Strong Medicine, and ER. She has also starred in several TV movies and had minor roles in several motion pictures such as Sleepless in Seattle and Avalon.
She also co-starred in You're Invited to Mary-Kate and Ashley's Sleepover Party starring former Full House stars Mary-Kate Olsen and Ashley Olsen.

So Weird
In her breakout role on So Weird, DeLizia played Fiona "Fi" Phillips, an adolescent girl obsessed with the paranormal. DeLizia left the show after the first two seasons and was replaced by Alexz Johnson. To that point, the show had been "darker" for a Disney show in the vein of The X-Files but when DeLizia departed, the show took on a lighter tone for the remainder of its run.

Later work
Her other major role was as Marcy Kendall on the FOX drama Boston Public where she played the assistant to Chi McBride's Principal Harper.

She voiced Z, a minor character introduced in the spinoff Rugrats series, All Grown Up. In 2002, Cara co-starred in Anna's Dream alongside former Caitlin's Way star Lindsay Felton.

DeLizia became engaged to Robert Chambers in 2001. The couple married in 2004 and lived in Burbank, California. In 2006, the couple divorced. As of 2012, Cara has retired from acting and voice acting. Cara's father is a consultant.

In December 2009, she married Nick Rich.

Filmography

Movies

Television

References

External links
 

20th-century American actresses
21st-century American actresses
Actresses from Maryland
American child actresses
American film actresses
American television actresses
Living people
People from Silver Spring, Maryland
American people of Italian descent
1984 births